Nele-Liis Vaiksoo (born 16 March 1984, in Tallinn) is an Estonian singer and actress.

Biography
In the 1990s Vaiksoo toured Europe with the Eesti Televisioon (ETV) concert choir. In 2000 she received fourth place at the all-Estonian song contest for children, organized by ETV. Vaiksoo's first stage performance in a musical was the 1998 Estonian original production of The King and I where she performed as a choir artist.

Roles

 1998: The King and I (choir artist) Tallinn City Hall
 2000: Tanz der Vampire (Sarah) Tallinn City Hall
 2001: No, No, Nanette (choir artist) Tallinn City Hall
 2001: Les Misérables (Cosette, understudy) Tallinn City Hall
 2002: Miss Saigon (Kim) Tallinn City Hall
 2003: Aida (Amneris, understudy) Vanemuine theatre
 2003: Miss Saigon (Kim, understudy) Germany, Luxembourg
 2003: Oliver! (Bet) Tallinn City Hall
 2004: Crazy for You (choir artist)
 2005: West Side Story (Maria) Vanemuine theatre
 2005: Cats (Jemima) Vanemuine theatre
 2005: Cinderella (Cinderella) Tallinn City Hall
 2006: Fame (Serena) Tallinn City Hall
 2007: Personals (Claire)
 2007: Phantom (mother) Tallinn City Hall
 2007: Pippi Longstocking (Pippi) Tallinn City Hall
 2008: Tanz der Vampire (Sarah) Oberhausen, Germany
 2011: Pippi Longstocking (Pippi) Estonian National Opera
 2011: Mary Poppins (Mary Poppins) Vanemuine theatre
 2012: Dreams from a Summer House (Belle)
 2013: Shrek (Fiona)
 2017: Les Misérables (Fantine) Vanemuine theatre
 2018: Beauty and the Beast (Babette) Vanemuine theatre
 2019: West Side Story (Rosalia) Estonian National Opera

Nele-Liis Vaiksoo has given her voice to the Estonian version of Disney's Tangled (2011) by dubbing the leading character's voice, the one of Rapunzel. At 2012, she gave her voice to another Disney's 3D animation The Lion King by dubbing the voice of Nala.

Discography
In 2003 the album We Are Family was released, which was recorded by Vaiksoo and eight other Estonian solo artists, such as Kaire Vilgats, Maiken, Bert Pringi, Lauri Liiv, and Lauri Pihlap. In 2008 she released a Christmas album together with Rolf Roosalu.

In 2011, Nele-Liis Vaiksoo released a concept album of the musical Pipi Pikksukk ("Pippi Longstocking") in which she played the lead character, Pipi. In 2013, she released an album Mina ("Me") to celebrate her 15 years on musical stage. The album consists of numbers from different musicals in which she has or still hopes to play in (Les Miserables, Little Shop of Horrors, Cats, Cabaret, Chess and many more).

References

1984 births
Living people
21st-century Estonian women singers
Estonian musical theatre actresses
Estonian television actresses
Estonian voice actresses
Singers from Tallinn
20th-century Estonian actresses
21st-century Estonian actresses
Actresses from Tallinn